GBA-1 (Gilgit-I) is a constituency of Gilgit Baltistan Assembly which is currently represented by the Amjad Hussain Azar of Pakistan Peoples Party who is the current opposition leader of the 3rd Gilgit Baltistan Assembly.

Members of Assembly

Election 2009
Syed Raziuddin Rizvi an independent politician became member of assembly by getting 10012 votes.

Election 2015
Jafarullah Khan of Pakistan Muslim League (N) won by getting 7171 votes and became Deputy Speaker of the Assembly.

Election 2020 
Amjad Hussain Azar won by 11178 votes and became the opposition leader.

References

Gilgit-Baltistan Legislative Assembly constituencies